Henry James Hall Marshall (24 November 1872 – 16 September 1936) was a Scottish footballer, who played for St Bernard's, Heart of Midlothian, Blackburn Rovers, Celtic, Clyde and Scotland.

See also
List of Scotland national football team captains

References

Sources

External links

1872 births
1936 deaths
Association football wing halves
Association football central defenders
Scottish footballers
Scotland international footballers
St Bernard's F.C. players
Heart of Midlothian F.C. players
Blackburn Rovers F.C. players
Celtic F.C. players
Clyde F.C. players
Scottish Football League players
English Football League players
Scottish Football League representative players
Footballers from Edinburgh